Nazranovsky District (Näsaren šaꜧar) is an administrative and municipal district (raion), one of the four in the Republic of Ingushetia, Russia. It is located in the central and western parts of the republic. Its administrative center is the town of Nazran (which is not administratively a part of the district). As of the 2010 Census, the total population of the district was 87,851.

Administrative and municipal status
Within the framework of administrative divisions, Nazranovsky District is one of the four in the Republic of Ingushetia and has administrative jurisdiction over all of its ten rural localities. The town of Nazran serves as its administrative center, despite being incorporated separately as a town of republic significance—an administrative unit with the status equal to that of the districts.

As a municipal division, the district is incorporated as Nazranovsky Municipal District. Its ten rural localities are incorporated into nine rural settlements within the municipal district. The town of republic significance of Nazran is incorporated separately from the district as Nazran Urban Okrug, but serves as the administrative center of the municipal district as well.

References

Notes

Sources

Districts of Ingushetia
